Qarwa Urqu (Quechua qarwa pale, yellowish, golden, urqu mountain, "yellowish mountain", hispanicized spelling Carhua Orjo) is a mountain in the Wansu mountain range in the Andes of Peru, about  high. It is situated in the Arequipa Region, La Unión Province, Huaynacotas District. Qarwa Urqu lies at the Yana Wanaku valley ("black guanaco", Yanahuanaco) northeast of Aqu Suntu and east of Wayrawiri.

References 

Mountains of Peru
Mountains of Arequipa Region